Eight Little Piggies (1993) is the sixth volume of collected essays by the Harvard paleontologist Stephen Jay Gould. The essays were selected from his monthly column "The View of Life" in Natural History magazine, to which Gould contributed for 27 years. The book covers topics that are common to Gould's writing in a discursive manner, including evolution and its teaching, science biography, probabilities, and common sense.

The title essay, "Eight Little Piggies", explores concepts such as archetypes and polydactyly via the anatomy of early tetrapods. Other essays discuss themes such as the scale of extinction, vertebrate anatomy, grand patterns of evolution, and human nature.

From Publishers Weekly

Reviews
The Snail Wars - by Derek Bickerton, The New York Times
Book review - by Howard A. Doughty, College Quarterly
Book review - John Farrell, National Review
Book review - Edward Kay, Eye Weekly

External links
W. W. Norton promotional page
Google Books -  contains book excerpts and jacket description

1993 non-fiction books
American essay collections
Books by Stephen Jay Gould
English-language books
Science books
Works originally published in Natural History (magazine)
W. W. Norton & Company books